The FIS Nordic World Ski Championships 1931 took place on February 13–15, 1931 in Oberhof.

Men's cross country

18 km 
February 13, 1931

50 km 
February 15, 1931

Men's Nordic combined

Individual 
February 13, 1931

Men's ski jumping

Individual large hill 
February 13, 1931

Medal table

References
FIS 1931 Cross country results
FIS 1931 Nordic combined results
FIS 1931 Ski jumping results
Results from German Wikipedia
Hansen, Hermann & Sveen, Knut. (1996) VM på ski '97. Alt om ski-VM 1925-1997 Trondheim: Adresseavisens Forlag. p. 44. . 

FIS Nordic World Ski Championships
1931 in Nordic combined
1931 in German sport
Sport in Oberhof, Germany
February 1931 sports events
Nordic skiing competitions in Germany
20th century in Thuringia